Roberts County is a county in the U.S. state of South Dakota. As of the 2020 United States Census, the population was 10,280. Its county seat is Sisseton. The county was named either for S. G. Roberts of Fargo, North Dakota, or for Solomon Robar, an early local French fur trader. It was created on March 8, 1883, and fully organized by August 6 of that year. Its boundary was altered once, in 1885.

Geography

Roberts County is at South Dakota's northeastern corner. Its eastern boundary abuts Minnesota (across the Bois de Sioux River), and its northern boundary abuts North Dakota. The Cottonwood Slough flows southward, draining the upper portion of the county into the River. The terrain consists of rolling hills, devoted to agriculture. The terrain slopes to the east; its highest point is on its upper western boundary line, at 2,047' (624m) ASL.

The Traverse Gap is in eastern Roberts County along the Minnesota border. The Lake Traverse Indian Reservation covers most of the county.

Major highways

  Interstate 29
  U.S. Route 12
  U.S. Route 81
  South Dakota Highway 10
  South Dakota Highway 15
  South Dakota Highway 25
  South Dakota Highway 106
 South Dakota Highway 109
  South Dakota Highway 123
  South Dakota Highway 127

Adjacent counties

 Richland County, North Dakota - north
 Traverse County, Minnesota - northeast
 Big Stone County, Minnesota - southeast
 Grant County - south
 Day County - southwest
 Marshall County - west

Protected areas

 Big Stone Island State Nature Area
 Crawford State Game Production Area
 Knutson State Game Production Area
 Harmon State Game Production Area
 Hartford Beach State Park
 Peever Slough State Game Production Area
 Sica Hollow State Park (part)
 White Rock State Game Production Area

Lakes and rivers

 Big Stone Lake
 Bois de Sioux River
 Clubhouse Lake
 Cottonwood Lake
 Dobberstien Slough
 Drywood Lakes
 Hurricane Lake
 Lake Bdesska
 Lake Traverse
 Little Minnesota River
 Oneroad Lake
 Owl Lake
 Round Lake
 Whetstone River (North fork)
 Whitestone Lake

Demographics

2000 census
As of the 2000 United States Census, there were 10,016 people, 3,683 households, and 2,618 families in the county. The population density was 9 people per square mile (4/km2). There were 4,734 housing units at an average density of 4 per square mile (2/km2). The racial makeup of the county was 68.29% White, 0.10% Black or African American, 29.86% Native American, 0.21% Asian, 0.03% from other races, and 1.51% from two or more races. 0.63% of the population were Hispanic or Latino of any race.

There were 3,683 households, out of which 33.80% had children under the age of 18 living with them, 53.50% were married couples living together, 11.80% had a female householder with no husband present, and 28.90% were non-families. 26.80% of all households were made up of individuals, and 12.40% had someone living alone who was 65 years of age or older. The average household size was 2.66 and the average family size was 3.22.

The county population contained 30.00% under the age of 18, 7.20% from 18 to 24, 23.60% from 25 to 44, 22.20% from 45 to 64, and 17.00% who were 65 years of age or older. The median age was 37 years. For every 100 females there were 98.80 males. For every 100 females age 18 and over, there were 98.20 males.

The median income for a household in the county was $28,322, and the median income for a family was $33,361. Males had a median income of $25,516 versus $19,464 for females. The per capita income for the county was $13,428. About 16.60% of families and 22.10% of the population were below the poverty line, including 30.10% of those under age 18 and 17.40% of those age 65 or over.

2010 census
As of the 2010 United States Census, there were 10,149 people, 3,823 households, and 2,655 families residing in the county. The racial makeup of the county was 61.7% white, 34.5% American Indian, 0.2% Asian, 0.1% black or African American, 0.4% from other races, and 3.0% from two or more races. Those of Hispanic or Latino origin made up 1.2% of the population. In terms of ancestry, 31.3% were German, 19.2% were Norwegian, 6.3% were Irish, and 3.8% were American.

Of the 3,823 households, 34.4% had children under the age of 18 living with them, 49.1% were married couples living together, 13.4% had a female householder with no husband present, 30.6% were non-families, and 27.3% of all households were made up of individuals. The average household size was 2.58 and the average family size was 3.11. The median age was 39.5 years.

The median income for a household in the county was $37,708 and the median income for a family was $46,146. Males had a median income of $34,080 versus $28,423 for females. The per capita income for the county was $19,825. About 14.3% of families and 20.0% of the population were below the poverty line, including 33.9% of those under age 18 and 11.0% of those age 65 or over.

Communities

Cities
 Sisseton (county seat)
 Wilmot

Towns

 Claire City
 Corona
 New Effington
 Ortley
 Peever
 Rosholt
 Summit
 White Rock

Census-designated places

 Agency Village

 Goodwill (former)

 Long Hollow
 Peever Flats
 White Rock Colony

Unincorporated communities

 Hammer
 Hartford Beach
 Hiawatha Beach
 Lindon Beach
 Shady Beach
 Victor

Townships

Agency
Alto
Becker
Bossko
Bryant
Dry Wood Lake
Easter
Enterprise
Garfield
Geneseo
Goodwill
Grant
Harmon
Hart
Lake
Lawrence
Lee
Lien
Lockwood
Long Hollow
Minnesota
Norway
One Road
Rosholt
Ortley
Sisseton
Springdale
Spring Grove
Summit
Victor
White Rock

Notable people
 Sleepy Eye, Sisseton Sioux chief
 Gene Okerlund, wrestling announcer

Politics

See also
 National Register of Historic Places listings in Roberts County, South Dakota

External links
 Roberts County, South Dakota (Official site)

References

 
1883 establishments in Dakota Territory
Populated places established in 1883